The 2018 Porsche Carrera Cup Great Britain was a multi-event, one-make motor racing championship held across England and Scotland. The championship featured a mix of professional motor racing teams and privately funded drivers, competing in Porsche 911 GT3 cars that conformed to the technical regulations for the championship. It formed part of the extensive program of support categories built up around the BTCC centrepiece. The 2018 season was the 16th Porsche Carrera Cup Great Britain season, commencing on 8 April at Brands Hatch – on the circuit's Indy configuration – and finished on 30 September at the same venue, utilising the Grand Prix circuit, after sixteen races at eight meetings. Fourteen of the races were held in support of the 2018 British Touring Car Championship, with a round in support of the 2018 European Le Mans Series at Monza.

Entry list

Race calendar and results
The majority of the races will held in the United Kingdom, with the exception of the round held at Monza in Italy.

Championship standings

Drivers' championships

Overall championship

References

External links
 

Porsche Carrera Cup
Porsche Carrera Cup Great Britain seasons